Hristijan Todorovski - Karpoš (3 September 1921 in Kumanovo – 7 February 1944  Biljača) was a Macedonian communist partisan during the Second World War.

As a student he was accepted in the communist youth organization SKOJ. Because of his progressive ideas, he was expelled from secondary school in 1940 and was not allowed to enroll in any other school in Yugoslavia.

In the year of the 1941, he participated in the gathering of weapons and participated in the distribution of the illegal pamphlets and the bulletin "Dedo Ivan" which was published by the Kumanovo communist organization. He was a member of the First Kumanovo partisan detachment, and became and participated in the battle with the Bulgarian police on 11 October 1941. After that he became a member of the partisan headquarters for Kumanovo. Further he went to the Second south Moravian detachment, and late in the Kukavian detachment. In the second half of the year 1942, he was sent as a courier in Kumanovo, and he used his arrival to form a new detachment with whom he achieves successful actions.

From the end of 1943 he became the commander of the Kumanovo "Jordan Nikolov" battalion of the NOV of Macedonia and had several successful actions against the Vardar Chetnik Corps, especially in Pelince, near Kumanovo.

Hristijan Todorovski died on 7 February 1944 while leading a raid on the Bulgarian police station in Biljaca, near Preševo.

Trivia
In 2009 marking the 490 years of the first mentioning of the name Kumanovo and 65 years of the liberation of Kumanovo, the Municipality of Kumanovo organized a cultural and artistic program in which they honored the Five impressive people from Kumanovo in the 20th century. Hristijan Todorovski Karpoš was one of the five to include: Vasil Iljoski, Trajko Prokopiev, Vladimir Antonov and Saltir Putinski. The Plaque was received by Mr. Todorovski's grandson Vladimir Todorovski.

Gallery

Sources 
 "Витражите на Куманово". Димитар Масевски, Скопје, 2004.

1921 births
1944 deaths
People from Kumanovo
Macedonian communists
Yugoslav Partisans members
Recipients of the Order of the People's Hero